Lou Whittaker (born February 10, 1929) is a mountaineer, mountain guide, and entrepreneur. He and his twin brother, Jim Whittaker, an equally renowned mountaineer and guide, were born and raised in Seattle.

Besides his worldwide mountain climbing experience, Whittaker became the most experienced glacier-travel guide by climbing Mount Rainier with over 250 summits.  He also established Rainier Mountaineering, developed a group of successful climbing-related businesses at the Rainier Base Camp in Ashford, adjacent to Mount Rainier National Park.  There he led the training of several generations of Rainier guides, many of whom continue to guide and climb elsewhere. He also led the first American ascent of the North Col of Mount Everest in 1984.

He has recorded his experiences in Lou Whittaker — Memoirs of a Mountain Guide, written with Andrea Gabbard.

Big Lou, a mountain in Chelan County, Washington is named for him.

References

External links
 Lou Whittaker: Memoirs of a Mountain Guide at Google Books

1929 births
Alpine guides 
American mountain climbers
Mountain climbers from Seattle
American twins
Living people
Twin sportspeople